Juston may refer to:

 Juston Burris (born 1993), an American football safety for the Carolina Panthers of the National Football League
 Juston Seyfert, a fictional character appearing in American comic books published by Marvel Comics
 Juston Wood (born 1979), an American football coach and former quarterback

See also 
 Justan (disambiguation)
 Justen (disambiguation)
 Justin (disambiguation)
 Justyn (disambiguation)